A Funny Mahometan was an 1897 short silent comedy film directed by Georges Méliès. It was released by Méliès's Star Film Company and numbered 94 in its catalogues, where it was advertised as a scène comique.

The film was shot outside in the garden of Méliès's property in Montreuil, Seine-Saint-Denis, with painted scenery. Méliès himself played the Muslim of the title. A Funny Mahometan, with its presumably Algerian Muslim, is the first known film on an Algerian topic in cinema history.

The film is currently presumed lost.

References

External links

Films directed by Georges Méliès
1897 films
Lost French films
French comedy short films
French silent short films
French black-and-white films
1897 comedy films
1890s lost films
1897 short films
Silent comedy films
1890s French films
Films about Islam